Cundo Bermúdez (September 3, 1914 – October 30, 2008), born Secundino (Cundo) Bermúdez y Delgado, was a Cuban painter. Born in Havana, Cuba, he died of a heart attack in his Westchester home on October 30, 2008.

In 1926, Bermudez was admitted at the 'Institute of Havana,' and in 1930 enrolled at the renowned Escuela Nacional de Bellas Artes “San Alejandro”, where he studied painting for two years. In 1934, he entered the University of Havana to study law and social sciences. He graduated in 1941. Later, he traveled to Mexico and studied at the Academy of San Carlos. In 1949 he founded the Asociación de Pintores y Escultores de Cuba (APEC).

Individual Exhibitions
 1942 - "Cundo Bermúdez. Gouaches y Acuarelas", Lyceum, Havana, Cuba.
 1946 - Palace of Fine Arts in Mexico
 1946 - Palacio de Bellas Artes de Buenos Aires, Buenos Aires, Argentina.
 1957 - "Exposición de Cundo Bermúdez", Instituto de Arte Contemporáneo, Lima, Perú.
 1974 - "Cundo Bermúdez Painting/Alfredo Lozano Sculptures", Bacardí Art Gallery, Miami, Florida.
 1979 - Museum of Modern Art of Latin America, Washington D.C.

Collective Exhibitions
He was part of many collectives exhibitions such as:
 1938 - "National Exhibition of Paintings and Sculptures" at the Castillo de la Fuerza, Old Havana, Cuba.
 1940 - "Three hundred Years of Art in Cuba", University of Havana, Havana, Cuba.
 1941 - "Cuban Contemporary Art Exhibition", Lyceum, Havana, Cuba.
 1942 - "Some Contemporary Painters", Lyceum, Havana, Cuba.
 1943 - "An Exhibition of Painting and Sculpture Modern Cuban", José Gómez-Sicre Institution, Havana.
 1944 -  Cuban Painting Exhibition at the Museum of Modern Art (MOMA), New York City.
 1950 - "Pinturas". Cundo Bermúdez, Amelia Peláez and Martínez Pedro. Lyceum, Havana, Cuba.
 1951 - "I São Paulo Art Biennial", Sao Paulo, Brazil.
 1952 - "XXVI Biennale di Venezia", Venice, Italy.
 1953 - "II  Bienal de San Juan del Grabado Latinoamericano", Instituto de Cultura Puertorriqueña, San Juan, Puerto Rico.
 1994 - "Cuban Artists: Expressions in Graphics", Jadite Galleries, New York City.

Awards
 Prize of Acquisition of the Gulf Caribbean Art Exhibition, Museum of Fine Arts of Houston, Houston, Texas.
 1972 - Hororable Mention, "Segunda Bienal de San Juan del Grabado Latinoamericano", Instituto de Cultura Puertorriqueña'', San Juan, Puerto Rico.
 1973 - “Homenaje a Picasso”, Organización de Estados Americanos (OEA), Washington, D.C.
 1973 - 'Cintas Foundation Fellowship', New York City.

Collections
 Lowe Art Museum, University of Miami, Coral Gables, Florida
 Kendall Art Center, Miami, Florida
 Museo Nacional de Bellas Artes de La Habana, Havana, Cuba
 Hotel Riviera, Havana, Cuba

References
 Eduardo Luis Rodriguez; The Havana Guide: Modern Architecture 1925-1965; (Princeton Architectural Press 2000); 
  Vicente Baez, Virilio Pinera, Calvert Casey, and Anton Arrufat, Editors; Pintores Cubanos, Editors; Ediciones Revolucion, Havana, Cuba 1962  
  Jose Veigas-Zamora, Cristina Vives Gutierrez, Adolfo V. Nodal, Valia Garzon, Dannys Montes de Oca; Memoria: Cuban Art of the 20th Century; (California/International Arts Foundation 2001); 
 Jose Viegas; Memoria: Artes Visuales Cubanas Del Siglo Xx; (California International Arts 2004);

External links

  Vanguard and Contemporary Cuban Art
 The artist's website
 Contacto magazine article
 Cundo Bermúdez Scrapbook at the Smithsonian's Archives of American Art
 Ediciones Vanguardia Cubana. Libros de Pintura Cubana, Cundo Bermudez

1914 births
2008 deaths
Cuban contemporary artists
Artists from Havana
Cuban male painters
Modern painters
Cuban emigrants to the United States